C3 policing or Counter Criminal Continuum Policing is a modification of counter-insurgency ("COIN") methods used by U.S. Army Special Forces and adapted for use by civilian law enforcement agencies. The C3 policing model was created and developed by Michael M. Cutone. This model is currently being implemented through a partnership between the Springfield, Massachusetts Police Department and a team of Massachusetts State Police (MSP) troopers (designated as the Massachusetts State Police Special Projects Team) to implement C3 policing methods in order to control criminal street gangs and illicit drug networks in the North End section of Springfield. The MSP Special Projects Team personnel includes two veteran Special Forces soldiers, Trooper Cutone (a master sergeant with the 19th SFG) and Trooper Thomas Sarrouf (a lieutenant colonel with the 19th SFG).

History 

The C3 policing model was created and developed by Michael M. Cutone, a senior NCO with the US Army Special Forces who served with 10th, 19th, and 5th SFG(A), totaling 25 years with Army Special Forces. In 2006, Cutone returned from a deployment in Avghani, Iraq, where his unit had used the principles of COIN to defeat insurgent networks. In October 2009, during the course of his patrol duties in Springfield, he determined that the principals of COIN utilized in Iraq might also be implemented to detect, disrupt, degrade, and dismantle gang activity in the city's high-crime North End section. After implementing the concept, the initiative received accolades from the citizens of the North End section as well as local public officials. C3 policing also received the support of the Superintendent of the Massachusetts State Police.

Local community praise and recognition for C3 policing 
On February 12, 2013 BusinessWest awarded C3 policing The Difference Makers. There are many needs within our society, and therefore many ways that individuals and groups can impact overall quality of life for the people in this region, said BusinessWest Associate Publisher Kate Campiti. And this year’s class of Difference Makers drives this point home." "The individuals who directed the implementation of the C3 Policing program in Springfield’s Brightwood section have succeeded in challenging the culture in that area of the city, she went on. People who were once afraid and apathetic now have a stake in their neighborhood. That’s making a major difference.

Chicopee MA., Frustrated with trash, noise and other nuisance problems, Richard Jones was getting ready to put his home on Exchange Street in Chicopee up for sale – and then the C3 policing unit arrived. “It is incredible. They are gaining everyone’s trust, particularly the homeless, the alcoholics, the drug addicts,” he said. “The people who used to run away from them now talk to them.”
 
Sen.Eric Lesser, (D) Hampden & Hampshire District Ma., “The C3 community policing initiative has been a gold standard for communities around the state and I have been a steadfast supporter of the C3 policing efforts.”

Sen. James Welch, D-West Springfield and state representatives Bud Williams, José Tosado, and Carlos González secured the funding as part of the fiscal year 2020 budget.
“You look at a program that delivers results and has shown to be highly effective in several communities here in Springfield and you want to help it succeed,” Welch said. “We are very proud of the progress the C3 initiative is making in the North End and in other areas like the Forest Park neighborhood, and we hope this will be something that extends to all of the neighborhoods in Springfield that need it.”
Welch said he is also impressed with the initiative’s reach, which now extends to the area of Chicopee that borders Springfield.
“Not a lot of programs are willing to collaborate and share their expertise with surrounding communities,” he said. “This program works and this funding is a way to help it move forward.”

Springfield Police "C3 anti-gang and community policing unit, currently operating in Mason Square, Forest Park, the South End and the North End, won compliments for communication with residents and attentiveness to community concerns. Citizen respondents praised the department's C3 police units - specially trained teams, working in tandem with state police, who both conduct community policing and target gangs and repeat offenders in high-crime neighborhoods. Orland Ramos [Springfield City Council President] suggested in an interview that the city should consider expanding the program.” 
 
Springfield Ma., Mayor Dominic Sarno (D), “The C-3 Policing Initiative is truly a grassroots partnership of mutual respect and accountability between our public safety officials, our residents, and our business community.  My hat’s off to Commissioner Barbieri and our brave and dedicated men and women in blue and just as important, our community of Springfield coming together as one.” The level of engagement has been very effective to the point that there are days when a resident would have to arrive very early to secure a seat at the meeting, many reaching capacity at the Mason Square Library meeting location.  Mason Square C-3 meeting facilitator Tracye Whitfield added, “I love the work that we ‘C-3’ do as a community. There is so much support from the city residents, police, the Mayor’s Office, the District Attorney’s Office, the Sheriff’s Department and many community organizations. We laugh together, play together; we listen to public issues and explore the challenges and resolves TOGETHER. Residents have expressed openly how they can see the difference with crime being down nearly 20% in Springfield overall.  It’s truly amazing what we can accomplish when we are in IT together.”

National news coverage 

60 Minutes news coverage of C3 Policing
The Hill:"Instead of defunding, Re-imagine policing with C3"

Research and analysis on C3 policing 
MeasureD is a resource for anyone wanting to understand, measure, and scale the impact of social design in order to strengthen society and create the conditions for equitable human health. It is intended to represent the highest level of practice and help organizations and practitioners understand where, when, and how social design is most effective. When we set out to find the most complete cases of social design used to benefit human health, we cast a wide net among our colleagues and network.

Harvard University C3 course scandal 

In January 2021, students at the Harvard School of Engineering and Applied Sciences created a petition objecting to a course on C3 policing at that school. Offered by Professor Kit Parker and titled "ENG-SCI 298R: Data Fusion in Complex Systems: A Case Study," the course promised to engage graduate student researchers to analyze the efficacy of a C3 techniques in Springfield, MA. The petition objected to the lack of analysis of structural racism, political economy, inequity in criminal justice, residential segregation in analysis.
   
Signatories demanded cancelling the class and a wide variety of other actions, including "a full independent, third-party review of Prof. Kit Parker," to determine if the professor should be disciplined for unethically offering a course about policing that was not centered on its oppression of and violence against persons of color, and a demand that the university's engineering faculty be educated in the doctrine of police abolition.

The dean of the engineering school announced the class was cancelled, and committed to reviewing the process of vetting class offerings.

References

External links 
 C3 Policing Website archive

Law enforcement in Massachusetts
Law enforcement techniques
Types of policing
Springfield, Massachusetts
Massachusetts State Police